Operation Akron was an operation conducted by the 1st Brigade, 9th Infantry Division and the 1st & 3rd Squadrons, 11th Armored Cavalry Regiment (11th ACR) in Hát Dịch, lasting from 9 to 29 June 1967.

Background
Hát Dịch, housed Base Area 301, a staging area for the Viet Cong (VC) 5th Division from which they could harass Highway 1, the main supply route between Biên Hòa and Xuân Lộc District and all points further north. They could also interdict Highway 15 to Vũng Tàu, Highway 2 into Phước Tuy Province and Highway 20 to Da Lat. While earlier operations had pushed the 5th Division east into the Mây Tào Mountains, they were expected to return to the Hát Dịch during the rainy season. In early June U.S. forces operating 15 km south of Blackhorse Base Camp observed PAVN moving towards the Hát Dịch.

9th Division commander MG George G. O'Connor devised the operation to clear the entire 250 square kilometers of Base Area 301. The 1st Brigade would move east from Highway 15 accompanied by an engineer task force. While the 1st Brigade provided protection, the engineers would use Rome plows to enlarge two parallel trails that eventually met east of Highway 2 and a third that joined the two in Hát Dịch. Simultaneously a squadron from the 11th Armored Cavalry Regiment would patrol with an Army of the Republic of Vietnam (ARVN) Ranger battalion east of Hát Dịch.

Operation
The operation commenced on 9 June and initially met little resistance. On 18 June the 3rd Squadron, 11th ACR located a recently abandoned VC camp on Slope 30 along Highway 2. That evening the 3/11th ACR established 4 separate night defensive positions west of Highway 2. At 01:00 on 19 January, the VC 1st Battalion, 274th Regiment attacked the northernmost defensive position which was the location of the squadron command post. The attack was beaten back after 1 hour by defensive fire, supporting artillery and helicopter gunships. 56 VC bodies were located around the perimeter, U.S. losses were 9 killed.

On 26 June, a VC soldier defected at Tuc Trung on Highway 20, claiming to be from the 3rd Battalion, 275th Regiment and said that his unit was based 10 km northwest of Tuc Trung. On 27 June the ARVN 18th Division commander Gen. Do Ke Giai sent a Ranger unit to probe the campsite which they found to be abandoned, but fell into a VC ambush. A 1/11th ACR task force was dispatched to the scene that evening and the following morning arrived at the site of the battle finding ARVN and VC dead. Meanwhile, an ARVN Battalion had located the VC further east and were heavily engaged and the 1/11th ACR moved to support them, blocking the escape route across the Đồng Nai river with gunship and artillery fire, however the VC were able to disengage as night fell. The following day the ARVN located and overran a VC Company. ARVN losses were 51 killed, but they claimed to have killed 167 VC while U.S. forces claimed a further 49.

In a follow up operation the ARVN engaged another VC force killing 40.

Aftermath
Operation Akron officially concluded on 29 June, PAVN/VC losses were 412 killed, U.S. losses were 9 killed and ARVN losses 51 killed.

References

1967 in Vietnam
Battles involving the United States
Battles involving Vietnam
Battles and operations of the Vietnam War in 1967
Battles and operations of the Vietnam War
History of Bà Rịa-Vũng Tàu Province
History of Đồng Nai Province